Orthothecium is a genus of mosses belonging to the family Hypnaceae.

The species of this genus are found in Eurasia, New Zealand and Northern America.

Species: 
 Orthothecium acuminatum Bryhn, 1907
 Orthothecium austrocatenulatum Kindberg, 1891
 Orthothecium bollei (De Not.) A. Jaeger
 Orthothecium celebesiae (Müll. Hal.) A. Jaeger
 Orthothecium chryseum (Schwägr.) Schimp.
 Orthothecium diminutivum (Grout) H.A. Crum, Steere & L.E. Anderson
 Orthothecium duriaei (Mont.) Besch.
 Orthothecium filum (Müll. Hal.) Kindb.
 Orthothecium hyalopiliferum Redf. & B.H. Allen
 Orthothecium intricatum (Hartm.) Schimp.
 Orthothecium lapponicum (Schimp.) C. Hartm.
 Orthothecium nilgheriense (Mont.) A. Jaeger
 Orthothecium ovicarpum (Dixon) W.R. Buck
 Orthothecium rufescens (Dicks. ex Brid.) Schimp.
 Orthothecium schlagintweitii (Sendtn. ex Müll. Hal.) Paris
 Orthothecium strictum Lorentz
 Orthothecium trichophyllum (Sw. ex Hedw.) M. Fleisch.

References

Hypnaceae
Moss genera